USS Block Island (CVE-21/AVG-21/ACV-21) was a  for the United States Navy during World War II. She was the first of two escort carriers named after Block Island Sound off Rhode Island and was the only American carrier sunk in the Atlantic during the war.

Originally classified AVG-21, she became ACV-21 on 20 August 1942, and CVE-21 on 15 July 1943. She was named after Block Island, an island in Rhode Island east of New York.

Construction and commissioning
Block Island was launched on 6 June 1942 by Seattle-Tacoma Shipbuilding Corporation in Tacoma, Washington, under a Maritime Commission contract; sponsored by Mrs H. B. Hutchinson, wife of Commander Hutchinson. She transferred to the United States Navy on 1 May 1942 and commissioned on 8 March 1943, with Captain Logan C Ramsey in command.

Aircraft carried
Block Island had capacity for up to 24 fighter and anti-submarine aircraft normally a mixture of Grumman Wildcat and Avengers with composition dependent upon the mission. The squadron had the callsign VC-25 USN (Composite Squadron Twenty Five).

When she was utilised in a ferry role, she could carry up to 90 aircraft depending on aircraft type.

Service history
Departing San Diego, California in May 1943, Block Island steamed to Norfolk, Virginia, to join the Atlantic Fleet. She then made two trips from New York City to Belfast, Ireland, carrying Republic P-47 Thunderbolt fighters.

USS Bogue (CVE-9) and  had pioneered new anti-submarine warfare (ASW) techniques in the Battle of the Atlantic, forming hunter-killer groups to destroy German submarines. During her four anti-submarine cruises, Block Island'''s aircraft sank two submarines and shared another two with her escorts.

U-1059 was transporting torpedoes to the Monsun Gruppe ("Monsoon Group"), a group of U-boats that operated in the Pacific and Indian Ocean. Of U-1059’s crew, 47 were killed and 8 captured.

Nine of the boat's crew were killed and 47 taken prisoner.

The boat lost 24 killed and there were 36 survivors, later transferred to Block Island.

SinkingBlock Island was torpedoed off the Canary Islands at 20:13 on 29 May 1944 by  who had slipped through her screen of escorts. U-549 fired three T-3 torpedoes, hitting her with two and severely damaging the ship which later sank.Images of USS Block Island sinking at Uboat archive.net Six crewmen were killed in the attack; the remaining 951 were picked up by the escorting destroyers.

When Block Island was torpedoed, six of her Wildcats were in the air and had no place to land.  They headed for the Canary Islands but all had to ditch at night after running out of fuel and only two of the pilots were rescued.

Reunions
Former crewmembers held several reunions, the final one in Fargo, North Dakota in 2019.

AwardsBlock Island'' received two battle stars for her service.

See also
List of U.S. Navy losses in World War II

References

External links
www.ussblockisland.us USS Block Island Association

Bogue-class escort carriers of the United States Navy
Ships built in Tacoma, Washington
1942 ships
World War II escort aircraft carriers of the United States
Ships sunk by German submarines in World War II
World War II shipwrecks in the Atlantic Ocean
Maritime incidents in May 1944